The patella is the kneecap bone.

Patella may also refer to:

Patella, a segment of the arthropod leg
Patella (gastropod), a genus of limpets in the family Patellidae